Kwaku Boateng (born 30 June 1974 in Eastmont, Ghana) is a Canadian high jumper. His personal best jump is 2.34 metres, achieved in July 2000 in Zagreb. Boateng competed representing Ghana from 1993 to 1996. From January 1997 he has competed for Canada. His hometown is Montreal, Quebec. Boateng is father to Tristan Boateng, and Zurri Boateng both basketball players (Class of 2025) (Class of 2027) attending Bill Crothers Secondary School in Markham, Ontario attending [St. Michaels secondary School]

International competitions

External links
 
 
 
  (1994, Ghana)
  (2002, Canada)
 
 
  Kwaku  Boateng at Radio-Canada.ca 

1974 births
Living people
Athletes from Montreal
Canadian male high jumpers
Ghanaian male high jumpers
Olympic track and field athletes of Canada
Athletes (track and field) at the 2000 Summer Olympics
Pan American Games gold medalists for Canada
Pan American Games medalists in athletics (track and field)
Athletes (track and field) at the 1999 Pan American Games
Commonwealth Games competitors for Ghana
Commonwealth Games medallists in athletics
Athletes (track and field) at the 1994 Commonwealth Games
Athletes (track and field) at the 2002 Commonwealth Games
Ghanaian emigrants to Canada
Naturalized citizens of Canada
Black Canadian track and field athletes
World Athletics Championships athletes for Canada
Commonwealth Games silver medallists for Canada
Medalists at the 1999 Pan American Games
Medallists at the 2002 Commonwealth Games